K-pop boy bands refer to South Korea's all-male idol groups who account for a large portion of the K-pop industry. Korean boy bands have aided in the global spread and promotion of Korean culture through their demonstrated prominence and popularity. First generation boy bands from the late 90s and early 2000s such as H.O.T., Sechs Kies, Shinhwa and g.o.d. are cited as building these foundations as the first successful all-male groups in Korea and through their participation in the first Hallyu Wave. In 2007 and onward, second generation groups such as Big Bang, TVXQ, Super Junior, 2PM, Shinee, Beast and Infinite continued to grow the popularity of boy bands domestically in Korea as well as globally through the second phase of Hallyu. The rise of groups such as Exo and BTS in 2012 and 2013 launched the third generation of boy bands and launched K-pop to mass global appeal. BTS in particular has attained mainstream western appeal with number one hits on Billboard charts and multiple collaborations with global artists such as Nicki Minaj, Coldplay and Halsey. Other major boy bands to have debuted from 2012 onward include Seventeen, NCT, Tomorrow X Together, Stray Kids and Enhypen all who continue to garner widespread attention and build K-pop's global appeal.

Generation 1 (1996–2002) 
Before the early 1990s, it was only solo artists doing trot. Then in 1992, South Korean music started shifting to a more hip hop-influenced sound with the debut of Seo Taiji and Boys, who used English in their songs. It was not until SM Entertainment founder Lee Soo-man created several groups such as H.O.T. and Shinhwa that the Hallyu Wave started. The first generation of K-pop began with the birth of the idol industry after the debut of H.O.T. in 1996 and follows the early years of K-pop and includes idol groups debuting from 1997 to 2002.

Other notable groups 

 1TYM 
 5tion 
 Black Beat 
 Click-B 
 Deux 
 DJ DOC 
 Every Single Day 
 Flower 
 F-iV 
 Fly to the Sky 
 Jinusean 
 jtL 
 K'Pop 
 Noel 
 NRG 
 Sweet Sorrow 
 The Blue 
 U-BeS 
 UN 
 Yurisangja

Generation 2 (2003–2011) 
As the popular first-generation idols disbanded during the early 2000s, ballads and R&B music became mainstream in the Korean music industry again. Since 2003, singers such as SG Wannabe, Wheesung, and Buzz became very popular.

Other notable groups 

 AA 
 Apeace 
 Battle 
 Boyfriend 
 DMTN 
 F.Cuz 
 J-Walk 
 LC9 
 Led Apple 
 Monday Kiz 
 Myname 
 N-Sonic 
 N-Train 
 One Way 
 Paran 
 S 
 Shu-I 
 Supernova 
 T-max 
 Touch 
 Tritops 
 U-KISS 
 Ulala Session 
 V.O.S 
 Vibe 
 Wanted 
 ZE:A

Generation 3 (2012–2017) 
K-pop saw a revival with the third generation that grew in the digital age with the influence of social media and resulted in the globalization of the genre. This era also saw a growth in survival programs that pushed for more competition, and includes idol groups that primarily debuted in 2012 to the end of 2019.

Other notable groups 

 14U 
 100% 
 2000 Won 
 24K 
 5urprise 
 A.C.E 
 A.cian 
 A-Jax 
 A-Prince 
 AlphaBat 
 B.I.G. 
 Beatwin 
 Big Brain 
 Big Star 
 Bigflo 
 Boys24 
 Boys Republic 
 C-Clown 
 Cross Gene 
 Day6 
 Golden Child 
 GreatGuys 
 HALO 
 HeartB 
 High4 
 History 
 HNB 
 Honey G 
 Honeyst 
 Hooni Yongi 
 Hotshot 
 Hyeongseop X Euiwoong 
 Imfact 
 In2It 
 IZ 
 JBJ 
 JJCC 
 K-Much 
 KNK 
 Longguo & Shihyun 
 Lunafly 
 M.Pire 
 M4M 
 Masc 
 Map6 
 M.O.N.T 
 Mr.Mr 
 MVP 
 MXM 
 Myteen 
 N.Flying 
 Newkidd 
 ONF 
 Pentagon 
 Rainz 
 Romeo 
 Seven O'Clock 
 SF9 
 Speed 
 Tasty 
 The Legend 
 The Rose 
 Toheart 
 Topp Dogg 
 TRCNG 
 Troy 
 TST 
 UP10TION 
 Uniq 
 UNVS 
 Varsity 
 VAV 
 Victon 
 Voisper 
 Vromance 
 Wonder Boyz 
 Xeno-T

Generation 4 (2018–present) 
This generation has had to overcome problems such as the COVID-19 pandemic, the resulting economic disruption, and the transition to virtual concerts. These groups are in a situation that needs them to pioneer a wider variety of publicity methods, including the recently active online performance.

Other notable groups 

 1Team 
 1the9 
 8Turn 
 AB6IX 
 Argon 
 ATBO 
 BAE173 
 BDC 
 Blank2y 
 Blitzers 
 Ciipher 
 CIX 
 Cravity 
 D-Crunch 
 D1ce 
 DKB 
 DKZ 
 Drippin 
 E'Last 
 ENOi 
 Epex 
 Ghost9 
 H&D 
 Just B 
 Kingdom 
 Luminous 
 MCND 
 Mirae 
 Noir 
 NTB 
 NTX 
 Omega X 
 Oneus 
 Onewe 
 OnlyOneOf 
 P1Harmony 
 SuperM 
 TAN 
 Target 
 Tempest 
 TFN 
 TNX 
 TO1 
 Trendz 
 Vanner 
 Verivery 
 W24 
 We in the Zone 
 WEi 
 X1 
 Younite

Late generations 
Some forums and news cited some groups as "late generation groups". The terms do not have exact time when they started, but the end period is always the first year of the new generation.

Some groups, like SHINee and Infinite were cited as "2.5 generation groups", while groups like Seventeen and Monsta X are cited as "3.5 generation groups".

See also 
 K-pop
 List of South Korean idol groups
 List of South Korean girl groups

Notes

References